The 1997 season is the 11th season of the league and, is the last as the MILL, began on January 4, 1997, and concluded with the championship game on April 12. The league was renamed to the National Lacrosse League after this season.

Team movement
The Charlotte Cobras, who debuted in the 1996 Major Indoor Lacrosse League season, folded after only a single winless season.

Regular season

All Star Game
No All-Star Game was played in 1997.

Playoffs

Awards

Weekly awards
Each week, a player is awarded "Player of the Week" honours.

Monthly awards
An award is also given out monthly for the best overall player.

All-Pro Teams
First Team:
Gary Gait, Philadelphia
Paul Gait, Rochester
Tom Marechek, Philadelphia
Mark Millon, New York
John Tavares, Buffalo
Dallas Eliuk, Philadelphia (goalie)

Second Team:
Thomas Carmean, Boston
Duane Jacobs, Rochester
Darris Kilgour, Buffalo
Jeff Klodzen, Baltimore
Bob Martino, Baltimore
Sal LoCascio, New York (goalie)

Statistics leaders
Bold numbers indicate new single-season records. Italics indicate tied single-season records.

See also
 1997 in sports

References
1997 Archive at the Outsider's Guide to the NLL

MILL
Major Indoor Lacrosse League seasons